Clive Hitch (17 May 1931 – 23 November 2008) was an Australian ice hockey player. He competed in the men's tournament at the 1960 Winter Olympics.

References

External links

1931 births
2008 deaths
Australian ice hockey forwards
Ice hockey players at the 1960 Winter Olympics
Olympic ice hockey players of Australia
People from Shepparton
Sportsmen from Victoria (Australia)